Cambysene was a region first attested in the Geographica ("Geography") of the ancient geographer and historian Strabo (64/3 BC –  AD). According to Strabo, it comprised one of the northernmost provinces of the ancient Kingdom of Armenia, and bordered on the Caucasus Mountains and a rough and waterless region through which a pass connecting Caucasian Albania and Iberia passed.

Name
The spelling Cambysene is the Latin form of the Greek Kambysēnē, which in turn was formed at some point in the Hellenistic period from an indigenous name which corresponded to Armenian Kʿambēčan. In Georgian the name is written as Kambečovani and in Arabic as Qambīzān. According to the 6th-century geographer Stephen of Byzantium, following popular but unverified traditional etymology, Kambysēnē was a persikē khōra ("Persian country") named after Cambyses II (530–522 BC), King of Kings of the Persian Achaemenid Empire. This claim is rejected by modern-day academics, who point to the Cambyses (modern Iori) river, a tributary of the Cyrus (Kura) river, as the origin of the word. According to the Iranologist Ernst Herzfeld (1879–1948) both the Cyrus and Cambyses rivers as well as the Old Persian names Kuruš and Kambūjiya were derived from two ethnic groups; although considered to be an attractive assumption, Herzfeld's hypothesis is viewed as doubtful by modern-day academics.

Geography
The precise boundaries of Cambysene are difficult to demarcate, but it is known that it constituted a border land between Armenia, Iberia and Caucasian Albania at the time of the 65 BC Roman military campaign in the region led by the general and statesman Pompey. The German historian Wilhelm Fabricius (1861–1920) believed that it just comprised the territory between the Cambyses and Alazonius (modern Alazan) rivers; the modern-day consensus is that it was much larger, and probably stretched all the way from the Cyrus river in the west to the Alazonius river in the east. Regardless of what Cambysene's precise boundaries actually were, the road(s) that passed through the region accorded to the region's geo-political importance.

History
It is unknown whether Cambysene was incorporated into the Achaemenid Empire. When the Kingdom of Armenia under the Artaxiad dynasty was at its territorial apex, during the reign of Tigranes II of Armenia (95–55 BC), Cambysene was one of its provinces or districts. Cambysene remained part of Armenia until it was conquered by Caucasian Albania, most likely after Tigranes was defeated in 69 BC by the Romans at the Battle of Tigranocerta.

The 7th-century Armenian Geography written by Pseudo-Movses of Khoren, locates Kʿambēčan on the Kur river in Caucasian Albania, which reveals that Kʿambēčan must have been smaller than the Cambysene of the Classical authors. The 10th-century historian Movses Kaghankatvatsi also mentioned the province of Kʿambēčan.

The Kʿambēčan of Armenian historiography was conquered by the Arabs in the 7th century. At the turn of the 9th century, together with Shaki to the east, it comprised an extensive territory over which the Armenian Smbateans held sway as vassals of the more powerful Bagratid dynasty. Its inhabitants were predominantly of Armenian origin and speakers of the Armenian language.

References

Sources
 
 

Historical regions
Provinces of the Kingdom of Armenia (antiquity)
History of the Caucasus
Cambyses II